The Kingdom of Reman or Kingdom of Rahman (Jawi: كراجأن رمان;) was a landlocked semi-independent Malay kingdom established in northern Malay Peninsula.

It was one of seven regions of Pattani Kingdom, an autonomous tributary state of Siam, between 1810 and 1902. Tuan Mansor, a member of the Patani aristocracy, ascended to the throne in 1810.

The state's territory straddles the present-day Malaysia-Thailand border, covering Amphoe Raman in Yala province in Thailand, as well as Upper Perak region and parts of Jeli and Upper Kelantan regions in Malaysia.

Etymology
The name of the state may be derived from a Patani Malay word rama' , cognate to standard Malay ramai, meaning "a large assembly". It is likely named after a growing settlement founded in the area around the late 18th century.

The earliest English-language reference of the state was made in 1818, between an agreement by the Governor of Prince of Wales' Island (Penang), John Bannerman to Tuan Long Mansur, the king of Reman in Kroh; another reference was written in 1824 by John Anderson, a Scottish diplomatic agent who stated Reman as one of the seven federated states of Patani. The territory was also referred to as Rahman and Rehman in English, and Raman (รามัน) in Thai.

Henry Burney,  a British commercial traveller and diplomat for the British East India Company, recorded in 1826 that Reman was one of the fourteen polities that pay tribute to the Siamese through their representatives in the provinces of Nakhon Si Thammarat and Songkhla.

History

Origin

The state of Reman was founded on territory carved out from the neighbouring principalities of Pujut, Jalor and Legeh, all part of the Patani Kingdom, in the early 19th century. It emerged as a single polity under Tuan Tok Nik Tok Leh in 1810. Tuan Tok Nik, also known as Tuan Mansor, a Patani nobleman, was appointed to manage the mining operations in the area during the reign of Muhammad Raja Bakar, the Sultan of Patani. In the late 18th century, he and his followers settled in the Kroh Plateau, an area that was receiving a mass exodus of people fleeing from the civil unrest in the Patani plains further north since the Siamese reconquest in 1785.

By 1808, Tuan Tok Nik, desiring for more political autonomy for the area, began his campaign for independence from Patani suzerainty. The campaign rapidly spiraled into a civil war. The Siamese, mobilised its forces to attack the Patani Kingdom as well. The Siamese emerged victorious, and the Patani Kingdom was severely weakened by the two-front incursion.

The Thais subsequently reorganised Patani in 1810 into a confederation of 7 semi-autonomous chiefdoms. The chiefdoms consist of Legeh, Nongchick, Patani, Reman, Saiburi, Yala and yaring. Each chiefdom was granted a high degree of autonomy and administrative powers were devolved to the Malay kingss. A portion of local revenue was paid to the Siamese as tribute. Loyalty to the crown was observed and any rebellion against the Siamese was not tolerated.

Tuan Tok Nik was affirmed as the ruler of Reman. Spanning an area between the upper reach of Sungai Pattani to Sungai Mas in the north and Lenggong down south, Reman was the largest state in the confederation.

The Perak-Reman War of 1826
A territorial dispute between Reman and Perak led to conflict between the two states, primarily around what is today the towns of Klian Intan and Pengkalan Hulu in Upper Perak region. Previously a border outpost Perak and Patani in the 18th century, the mineral-rich area was captured in 1790, becoming an integral part of Reman state.

In 1826, Sultan Abdullah Muazzam Shah of Perak sought the assistance of the British East India Company to regain control of the resource-rich territory. Perakian forces were deployed to the plateau for their campaign into Reman. The king of Reman Tuan Mansor, withdrew his forces from Kubu Kapeh to Klian Intan and later to Kuala Kepayang. It took several years for Reman to reconquer the area.

Post-War recovery and growth

The kingdom's strategic location between the east and west coast of the peninsula fueled its growth throughout the 19th century. The border conflict with Perak was followed by a period of relative stability and unprecedented prosperity due to the restoration of mining activities in the region, under the auspices of Toh Nang Patani, a local noble. Though sporadic border skirmishes with Perak continued, they were usually won by Reman militia, commanded by Mengkong Deleha, a renowned Reman fighter.

Hostilities between Reman and Perak formally come to an end in 1882 when both parties sought to formalise the border. Under British mediation, both states agreed that the new border shall be located along Bukit Nasha (5.3571123,101.0294051), some 11 kilometres (6.8 miles) southwest of Gerik town.

The border was adjusted in 1899, when the border was shifted north to Kerunai, thus transferring Gerik town to the Federated Malay States, which Perak became part of, four years prior. Several boundary markers were erected, with each pillar standing 1 metre high and 1 metre wide.

Independence movement

The rise of nationalist movements in Reman was a result of wider Pan-Patani Malay nationalism in the region. It was a result of loss of local sovereignty to Siamese hands in 1785. Nationalist movements in the area in the late 19th century called for a restoration of an ideal sovereign Pattani kingdom, hoping to protect native lands and interests without interference from the Siamese government.

In 1902, the Siamese, alarmed by the nationalist movements in the south, began a major military crackdown against the Malay leaders who were suspected of involvement. Among the political elites that were arrested by the Siamese forces includes Tuan Lebeh Long Raya, the Raja Muda (crown prince) of Reman; Abdul Kadir Kamaruddin Syah, the Sultan of Patani and Tengku Abdul Mutallib, the King of Teluban.

Dissolution and annexation
Tuan Lebeh was then charged in the Siamese court in Singgora. The trial found the crown prince of Reman to be guilty of treason and he was offered two sentence options: a 25 years imprisonment in Singgora or 20 years in Bangkok. Tuan Lebeh opted for the second sentence. He was then transferred to Bangkok via a Siamese vessel, Chamroen. The ship sank during the voyage to Bangkok and the prince was believed to be perished in the disaster. Devastated by the news, the king died a few weeks later, without an heir apparent.

The same year also marked the beginning of Siamese moves to strip whatever was left of local autonomy in Pattani. In 1906 Pattani was once again reorganised into a monthon or division and administered by a Siamese governor. The newly created division was then divided into three provinces - Pattani, Yala and Narathiwat, each headed by a high commissioner. Under the new system, Reman was absorbed into Yala changwat as Amphoe Yala.

Aftermath
"..Setul would not be of no great values to us, and although we might do doubt put forward a very good claim to its part of Kedah and secure it by insistence, I am inclined to think it would be more Politics to turn our claim to account by agreeing to renounce Setul if the Siamese Government will in its stead hand over to us the Lang-kawi Islands and that portion of Raman which comprise the watershed of the Perak River. Both these would constitute more velueable posessions to us than Setul. The Lang-kawi Islands furnish magnificent anchourages and such have been coveted by various foreign powers, whilst the lower part of Reman is rich in Tin"
<p style="text-align: right;">— Ralph Paget, British Minister to Thailand, in his letter to Edward Grey, Secretaries of State for Foreign Affairs (29 April 1907)

Ignited by colonial ambitions, the British aimed to expand its territories in the far east. By the dawn of the 20th century, it had already acquired a collection of polities consisting of crown colonies and protectorates in the central and southern parts of the Malay peninsula. The British incorporated the areas into the Straits Settlements and the Federated Malay States between 1786 and 1895 respectively.

In 1909, alarmed by the growing ties between the  German colonial powers and the Siamese, especially in the peninsula, the British sought to enter an agreement with the Siamese. The acquisition of the northern states was deemed essential for the British, as it was strategically located by the mouth of Straits of Malacca and rich with tin, an important commodity for the industrial revolution and trade by the late 19th century. This led to the Anglo-Siamese Treaty of 1909 that broke the peninsula between Siamese and British jurisdictions.

One of the prospective areas for British expansion included Reman district, which by then had been absorbed into Yala Province in 1906. The area was known to be rich in gold ore, as well as holding one of the largest tin reserves in the whole peninsula. During the discussion between the Siamese and the British, the British agreed to abandon its claims for Satun in exchange for the Langkawi archipelago and the Lower Reman region. The UK was also required to provide a loan to finance the construction of the south line of Siamese State Railway which cost £4 million pounds (1909).

Partition of the old kingdom, partial cession to the FMS
The 1909 treaty split the territory of the old kingdom into two jurisdictions. Reman Hulu (upper Reman) in the north, remained within Siam, as an amphoe of Yala Province, while Reman Hilir (Lower Reman) in the south, which included Kroh, was ceded to Perak State of the Federated Malay States, as part of Upper Perak region. A cession ceremony was held on 16 July 1909 in Kroh. The ceremony was attended by: Wan Muhammad Isa, Orang Kaya Menteri; Wan Muhammad Salleh, Orang Kaya-Kaya Seri Adika Raja; E.W. Birch, the British Resident of Perak; A.S. Jelf, MCS, Assistant Secretary to British Resident of Perak; H. Berkeley, District Magistrate; G. Simpson, Police Inspector of Kuala Kangsar; J.D. Kemp, Manager of Rahman Hydrolic Tin Limited, Klian Intan and Keluong Wan Husain, a noble from Betong, Siam.

Wan Husain, as the Siamese plenipotentiary, announced the transfer of sovereignty from Siam to the United Kingdom. It was followed by a flag raising ceremony, symbolising the end of Siamese rule and beginning of Perak's sovereignty in the lower Reman area.

Rulers of Reman, 1810–1902
Throughout its history, Reman was ruled by the descendants of Tuan Tok Nik Tok Leh, the founding father of Reman.

Influence and legacy

A century rule of Reman has established a mark in the two separate territories (Yala and Hulu Perak) that once form an integral domain of the kingdom. The areas till today are marked by a Patani-Reman influence, bind together with a common culture, linguistic and heritage as a result from the emigration from the Patani lowlands during the Reman period.

Several monuments can be witnessed as testaments of the former splendor of the Reman Kingdom. This includes Istana Singgah (The Visiting Palace), the palatial residence of the royal family in lower Reman. It is credited as one of the best example of the traditional architecture in the Kingdom. Located in Kampung Selarong, it was built in the late 19th century as a secondary palace away from the administrative centre of the kingdom in Kota Baru (in present-day Yala). The manor was once a fortress of Tuan Lebeh before he was being arrested by the Siamese authorities due to a suspected uprising plot for Patani independence. The final resting place of Permaisuri Cik Neng, the Queen of Reman is also located nearby the palatial grounds, her death in 1915 was widely believed due to her devastation after the demise of the crown prince. The residence is currently privately owned by the descendants of Reman royal family.

The waves of migration from the plains of Patani also bought a strong Patani based linguistic heritage. The Reman dialect is largely based on Patani form of Malay, nonetheless it has incorporated various peculiar features that denotes influence from the Perakian and Kedahan Malay dialects. It constitute as a dialect continuum between the East and the West Coast Malay language. In Perak, the variant is also known locally as Longat Pattani Batu Kurau.

Various namesake of areas in Hulu Perak was derived from the Patani settlers to Reman, this includes Kroh (murky), a town that derives its name from the muddy reservoir built by the Reman settlers to clean the domesticated elephants owned by the king. The area has been renamed as Pengkalan Hulu in 1985. While Gerik, a major settlement established in Reman during the rule of Tuan Jagong owes its name from "Gerit", an onomatopoeia for the sounds made by the Bamboo rat, a native rodent that can be found in abundance in area.

The Reman heritage is also widely survived in the local literature and folklore. Among the prominent literature that composed during the Reman period was a pantun crafted by Tuan Tok Nik Tok Leh to Raja Andak, the wife of Dato’ Seri Lela, the commander of the Perakian troops during the Perak-Reman war of 1826. The pantun between Tuan Tok Nik to Raja Andak narrated the forbidden love between the two parties from the two rivalling sides of the war. Another prominent figure of Reman oral literature includes Mengkong Dehela, a local warrior, he is a central figure that largely credited on leading and defending Reman territories. Details of his epic battles are largely recorded in the local lore.

Another visible legacy of the Reman period includes batu tanda (boundary marker), built in 1899 under the agreement between Perak and Reman, it signifies the historical border between the two states. The pillars still standing today despite a major border reformation in 1909, a reminder of the bygone era.

References

Bibliography

 
 
 
 
 
 
 
 
 
 
 
 
 
 
 
 
 
 

Reman, Kingdom of
Reman, Kingdom of
Reman, Kingdom of
Reman, Kingdom of
Reman, Kingdom of
Reman, Kingdom of
Reman, Kingdom of
Reman, Kingdom of
Reman, Kingdom of
Reman, Kingdom of
Reman, Kingdom of
Reman, Kingdom of
Reman, Kingdom of
Reman, Kingdom of